Shirley Bassey was a British variety show that premiered on BBC in 1976. The show was hosted by Welsh singer Shirley Bassey and produced by Stewart Morris. The first six-episode season was nominated for the Golden Rose of Montreux in 1977. This was followed by a second season of six episodes in 1979. The musical guests included The Three Degrees, Charles Aznavour, Neil Diamond and Dusty Springfield.

Season 1 
Season one was broadcast on Saturdays on BBC1. The series (excluding the 7th highlights episode) was repeated on BBC2 on non-consecutive Thursdays from 23 June – 4 August 1977.

Season 2 
Season two was broadcast on alternate Saturdays on BBC1. This Series repeated on Mondays on BBC2 from 15 September – 20 October 1980 at 8:15pm.

References

External links 

1976 television series debuts
1979 television series endings
BBC Television shows
English-language television shows
1970s British music television series